Lôn Eifion is part of Lôn Las Cymru, the Welsh National Cycle Route, which is about  long.

This line was that of the Carnarvonshire Railway (later LNWR and London, Midland and Scottish Railway), and joined with the Cambrian Coast Line at Afon Wen. Running alongside for part of the way is the trackbed of the old Nantlle Tramway, along which horse-drawn trams carried slates from the quarries in the Nantlle Valley to the port at Caernarfon from where they were exported.

From Caernarfon to Llanwnda Station the Lôn Eifion runs alongside that of the Welsh Highland Railway. At the Llanwnda station the Lon Eifion continues south over Glanrhyd to the A487/A499 Pwheli/Porthmadog roundabout, which prior to the Penygroes bypass, was the site of the old Llanwnda Rail Station on the Carnarvonshire Railway. Crossing the roundabout you join the Llanwnda - Groeslon section of the route Lon Eifion, passing on your right the railway cottages built to serve the railway station. The route continues alongside the A487 before passing underneath the road bridge at Afon Llifon before continuing to the village of Groeslon. Crossing the road at the Tafarn Pennionyn the Lon Eifion continues on the East side of the A487 until crossing over again via a foot bridge. Once over the foot bridge the Lon Eifon cuts through woodland heading due South, passing the rear of Inigo Jones Slate Works and further on to open field land with views to the West of Pontllyfni and Aberdasach and The Rivals until reaching another footbridge at the end of Clynogg Road and continuing down to the roundabout of A487/B4418. Continuing south the Lon Eifion continues to closely follow the A487 until vearing away and more South Westerly at Nebo. It continues on a much quieter and greener route along the old railway line through trees and farm land down to Bryncir.

At Bryncir the cycle route deviates from the old railway line and heads westerly and steeply upward through a farm and on to single track road before heading south again into Cricceith.

See also 
 Rail trail

References

https://www.whr.co.uk/
https://www.walesonline.co.uk/news/wales-news/new-link-road-bid-ease-12923049
https://en.wikipedia.org/wiki/Llanwnda_railway_station.
https://en.wikipedia.org/wiki/Carnarvonshire_Railway
https://getoutside.ordnancesurvey.co.uk/local/groeslon-gwynedd-ll547tn
https://getoutside.ordnancesurvey.co.uk/local/bryncir-gwynedd

External links
Gwynedd Council - Recreational Routes - Lôn Eifion
Sustrans Routes2Ride: Cycling Lôn Eifion

Cycleways in Wales
Transport in Gwynedd
Rail trails in Wales